József Berkes (31 December 1890 in Pancsova – 25 January 1963 in Budapest) was a Hungarian gymnast who competed in the 1912 Summer Olympics. He was part of the Hungarian team, which won the silver medal in the gymnastics men's team, European system event in 1912.

References

External links
profile
profile 

1890 births
1963 deaths
Sportspeople from Pančevo
Hungarians in Vojvodina
Hungarian male artistic gymnasts
Gymnasts at the 1912 Summer Olympics
Olympic gymnasts of Hungary
Olympic silver medalists for Hungary
Olympic medalists in gymnastics
Medalists at the 1912 Summer Olympics
20th-century Hungarian people